Coldbrook Park, Llanover, Monmouthshire, Wales, was a major country house and estate. Home successively to the Herberts, the Hanburys and the Halls, the house was demolished in 1954. The estate, which remains privately owned, is listed on the Cadw/ICOMOS Register of Parks and Gardens of Special Historic Interest in Wales.

History
The Monmouthshire antiquarian Sir Joseph Bradney suggests that the first recorded owner of the Coldbrook estate was Richard Herbert, second son of William ap Thomas of Raglan Castle. The Herbert family's origins were at Wern-ddu in the north of the county. Executed after the Battle of Banbury in 1469, Richard Herbert was buried in the Priory Church of St Mary, Abergavenny. In the mid-18th century, the estate was sold to John Hanbury (1664–1734) of Pontypool, who passed it to his third son, Charles Hanbury Williams (1708-1759). Hanbury Williams, a diplomat, poet and wit, undertook a major rebuilding of the mediaeval house in a Palladian style. William Coxe, who stayed at Coldbrook on his tour of Wales in 1799, devotes nine pages of his An Historical Tour of Monmouthshire to recording Hanbury Williams' anecdotes and witticisms. In the late 19th century, the park was bought by Lady Llanover, later coming into the ownership of Arthur Herbert, of Llanarth Court.

Following the death of Lady Helen Herbert, the contents of Coldbrook Park were dispersed at an 11-day sale in 1952, and the house was demolished in 1954. Coldbrook Park estate remains in the possession of the Herbert family, along with the adjacent estate at Llanover. In 2022, it was listed on the Cadw/ICOMOS Register of Parks and Gardens of Special Historic Interest in Wales.

Architecture and description

Little is known of the original house of the Herberts, although Bradney, writing in the very early 20th century, described parts as being "very ancient". The Royal Commission on the Ancient and Historical Monuments of Wales suggests 13/14th centuries origins for the building, with reconstruction in the Tudor era. Coxe, who saw Hanbury Williams' mid-18th century remodelling, considered it "delightfully situated", though more suited to occupation in the warm summer months as it was surrounded by trees and north-facing. John Newman, in his Gwent/Monmouthshire volume of the Pevsner Buildings of Wales was less complimentary, calling Hanbury Williams' designs, "somewhat gauche Palladian". Newman notes that nothing now remains of the house beyond some stables and outbuildings which have been converted to residential use.

The park dates mainly from the 18th century, with 19th and 21st century additions. However, the Parks & Gardens UK record suggests evidence of Tudor terracing. It also notes the existence of an external cold bath. The park is listed at Grade II. A small chapel by a lake, constructed by Lady Llanover is also Grade II listed.

Footnotes

References

Sources

External links
 RCAHMW collection of photographs of the house

Country houses in Monmouthshire
Registered historic parks and gardens in Monmouthshire